Felix van Groeningen (born 1 November 1977) is a Belgian film director and screenwriter. He is known for The Broken Circle Breakdown (2012) and Belgica (2016), with the former being nominated for Best Foreign Language Film at the 86th Academy Awards. He made his English-language debut with the biographical drama Beautiful Boy (2018).

Personal life
Van Groeningen was born in Ghent. His parents were hippies who led a very liberal lifestyle. He has an older brother, Seppe. After his parents' divorce, they lived in the same house, but each with a new partner. His father started a live music club 'The Charlatan' when he was twelve-years-old, which became the inspiration for his film Belgica. He studied at the Royal Academy of Fine Arts (KASK) and graduated in 2000 with a Masters of Audiovisual Arts, his masters thesis was the short film 50CC. He and Belgian actress Charlotte Vandermeersch have a son, Rufus, who was born in 2018.

Career 
After graduating from college, van Groeningen directed several short films, and written and directed several stage plays. He embarked on a long-term collaboration with Dirk Impens, originally his professor at KASK, who produced all five of Van Groeningen's feature films from 2004 to 2016 under his production company Menuet. Impens announced he was closing down Menuet in July 2017.

Feature films

Steve + Sky and With Friends Like These
Van Groeningen made his directorial debut with Steve + Sky (2004), which depicts a romance between a drug dealer and a prostitute, and starred Titus De Voogdt and Delfine Bafort in the titular roles. Van Groeningen later said the film "was about realizing that you're not invincible or immortal" after having an epiphany at age 23 when his father died due to complications with a liver transplant and he lost a close friend to cancer. His second feature, With Friends Like These (2007), was a comedy which tells the story of a struggling group of twenty-year-olds whose lives get thrown into limbo when their friend returns from New York.

The Misfortunates
His third feature film, The Misfortunates (2009), was a film adaptation the 2006 semi-autobiographical novel of the same name by Dimitri Verhulst. The film follows the life of the thirteen-year-old protagonist, Gunther, who is raised by a family of alcoholics and misfits as he grows up and dreams of being a writer. The film premiered at Cannes Film Festival in the Director's Fortnight section and won the Prix Art et Essai. The film was a box office success in Belgium with 454,435 admissions to cinemas, and was the most watched Flemish film that year in Belgium. The film was selected as the Belgian entry for Best Foreign Language Film at the 82nd Academy Awards.

The Broken Circle Breakdown 
His fourth feature film, The Broken Circle Breakdown (2012), starred Johan Heldenbergh and Veerle Baetens as Didier and Elise, a bohemian couple that loses their daughter to cancer. It is an adaptation of a stage play originally written and directed by Heldenbergh. The film was a critical and commercial success, and became the most watched Flemish film in Belgium of the year. The film was selected as the Belgian entry for Best Foreign Language Film at the 86th Academy Awards, and was on the nominated shortlist. He was invited to become a member of Academy of Motion Picture Arts and Sciences in 2014.

Belgica 
His fifth feature film, Belgica (2016), follows the lives of two brothers who start a nightclub but quickly gets swept up in hedonistic pursuits. The film was based upon two real-life brothers who bought 'The Charlatan', a music club owned by his father, in 2000 and managed it for seven years. The film premiered at Sundance Film Festival where he won the Best Director prize in the World Cinema Dramatic section. The film received mixed reviews from critics but was praised for the soundtrack created by the Flemish band Soulwax, who had previously collaborated with Van Groeningen on Steve + Sky.

Beautiful Boy
Van Groeningen made his English-language debut with the film Beautiful Boy (2018), which he directed and co-wrote, and which stars Steve Carell and Timothée Chalamet.

Filmography

Feature films

Frequent collaborators

References

External links 

Belgian film directors
Flemish film people
1977 births
Living people
Belgian screenwriters
Belgian film producers